This is a list of the tallest buildings in Edmonton, the capital city of the province of Alberta in Canada.

The tallest is the Stantec Tower, the tallest Canadian building outside Toronto, which surpassed the previous record holder, JW Marriott Edmonton Ice District & Residences, on 23 May 2018.

Edmonton's first true skyscraper, and the tallest building in Western Canada for five years, was the CN Tower, built in 1966. A building boom did not really begin until the oil shocks of 1973 and 1979, which prompted construction of many of the city's current tall buildings (17 of the top 20, as of 2019). Highrise construction was virtually non-existent between the mid-1980s and the early 2000s due to low oil prices, upon which Edmonton's economy depends.

The rapid oil price increases of 2003-2008 had created a new boom in Alberta and prompted new construction again. Due to the time lag between the beginning of the boom and when buildings are completed, the next wave of new highrise buildings really began construction in 2006 or 2007 and many were not completed until after the 2008 financial crisis had caused a drop in oil prices.

As of November 2021 many construction projects are delayed due to the COVID-19 pandemic.

Currently, Edmonton has 280 completed high-rise buildings, with 13 more under construction and another 41 approved for construction or proposed.

Tallest buildings
This list ranks buildings in Edmonton that stand at least 100 metres (328 ft) tall, based on CTBUH height measurement standards. This includes spires and architectural details but does not include antenna masts.

Projects

Table entries with dashes (—) indicate that information regarding building height (other than statements of "will be over 100 m" or "will be over 25 floors") or date of completion has not yet been released. Sources disagree on the name of some buildings, which may change before officially opening. Even if not indicated, heights may be estimated, and may change during construction.

Timeline of tallest buildings

See also

 List of tallest buildings in Canada
 List of tallest buildings in Alberta
 List of tallest buildings in Calgary
 Heritage buildings in Edmonton

References

External links 
 Edmonton High-Rise Buildings - Emporis

Edmonton

Tallest buildings
Tallest buildings in Edmonton